Bergère (French "shepherd", female form) was a 300-ton ship. On May 14, 1785, it transported 273 Acadians and 5 French from Nantes, France to New Orleans, Louisiana, arriving August 15, 1785.

External links
 History and passenger manifest

Age of Sail ships of France
Acadian history
History of Louisiana
Ships built in France